Kesknõmme Nature Reserve is a nature reserve which is located in Saare County, Estonia.

The area of the nature reserve is 481 ha.

History of the protected area dates back to the year 1959 when Sepise yew was taken under protection. In 1965, the borders were widened.

References

Nature reserves in Estonia
Geography of Saare County